{{DISPLAYTITLE:C9H12N2O5}}
The molecular formula C9H12N2O5 (molar mass: 228.20 g/mol, exact mass: 228.0746 u) may refer to:

 Deoxyuridine (dU)
 Zebularine

Molecular formulas